Jace Bugg (November 6, 1976December 4, 2003) was an American professional golfer who played on the Nationwide Tour.

Bugg was named the 1997 Kentucky Golf Association Player of the Year. He played on the Canadian Tour from 1999 to 2001 where he picked up a win in 2001 at the South Carolina Challenge. He joined the Nationwide Tour in 2002 when he was a Monday qualifier for the Arkansas Classic and went on to win the event.

Bugg was diagnosed with leukemia in November 2002 and died on December 4, 2003, at St. Mary's Hospital and Medical Center in Evansville, Indiana.

The Kentucky Golf Association started The Jace Bugg Award in 2005 for Sportsmanship, an award they give out annually. He was also named to the Rend Lake College Hall of Fame.

Professional wins (2)

Buy.com Tour wins (1)

Canadian Tour wins (1)

External links

American male golfers
PGA Tour golfers
Golfers from Kentucky
Deaths from cancer in Indiana
Deaths from leukemia
People from Henderson, Kentucky
1976 births
2003 deaths